Heliophorus epicles, commonly known as the purple sapphire, is a species of lycaenid or blue butterfly found in Asia. The species was first described by Jean Baptiste Godart in 1823.

Subspecies
The subspecies of Heliophorus epicles are:
 Heliophorus epicles epicles Fruhstorfer, 1918 – western Java
 Heliophorus epicles hilima Fruhstorfer, 1912 – eastern Java
 Heliophorus epicles latilimbata Fruhstorfer, 1908 – Nepal, Sikkim, Bhutan, Assam, Myanmar, Andamans, Thailand, Laos, Vietnam, southern Yunnan
 Heliophorus epicles tweediei Eliot, 1963 – Peninsular Malaya
 Heliophorus epicles sumatrensis Fruhstorfer, 1908 – Sumatra
 Heliophorus epicles phoenicoparyphus Holland, 1887 – Hainan

Distribution
In India, this butterfly can only be traced in the Himalayas at 2000–7000 ft (600–2100 m). Apart from that they can be found from Kumaon in the Himalayas to southern Myanmar. They mainly inhabit in dense forest region.

Gallery

See also
List of butterflies of India
List of butterflies of India (Lycaenidae)

References

 
 
 
 
 
 

Heliophorus
Butterflies of Asia
Butterflies described in 1823